Véronique Trillet-Lenoir (born 12 June 1957) is a French oncologist and politician of La République En Marche! (LREM) who was elected as a Member of the European Parliament in 2019. Since joining the Parliament, Trillet-Lenoir has been a member of the Committee on the Environment, Public Health and Food Safety.

Early life and education
Trillet-Lenoir studied at the Faculty of Medicine of Claude Bernard University Lyon 1. She completed her medical studies in 1980, obtained a state doctorate in medicine in 1985, and a doctorate in human biology in 1991.

Career
Trillet-Lenoir received an authorization to conduct research and a professorship in 1993. After having obtained her PhD in medicine and following her medical internship, she worked with clinical scientists at the University of Texas MD Anderson Cancer Center in Houston, Texas. During that time, she took part in the development of predictive tests to ascertain the sensitivity of cancers to chemotherapy

In 1993, Trillet-Lenoir was appointed professor at the University of Lyon-I and hospital practitioner at the University Hospital Centre of Lyon, where she created in 2003 the oncology department.

From 2013, Trillet-Lenoir served as president of the board of directors of the Cancéropôle Lyon Auvergne-Rhône-Alpes (CLARA), a research cluster dedicated to cancer. She was also a member of the board of directors of the National Cancer Institute.

Trillet-Lenoir became an associate professor at the Faculty of Medicine of Shanghai Jiao Tong University in Shanghai in 2018. She had already been visiting the university since 2011, having contributed to the establishment of the first Master's degree program in oncology.

Political career
Trillet-Lenoir became a Member of the European Parliament in the 2019 elections. She has since been serving on the Committee on the Environment, Public Health and Food Safety. She later joined the Special Committee on Beating Cancer (2020) and the Special Committee on the COVID-19 pandemic (2022). She is also her parliamentary group's rapporteur on measures against cancer and on the Health Emergency Preparedness and Response Authority (HERA).

In addition to her committee assignments, Trillet-Lenoir has been co-chairing the MEPs Against Cancer group. She is also a member of the European Parliament Intergroup on Anti-Corruption.

Recognition
 2008 – Legion of Honour
 2016 – National Order of Merit

References

1957 births
Living people
MEPs for France 2019–2024
21st-century women MEPs for France
La République En Marche! MEPs